"Chuck Versus the A-Team" is the eighteenth episode of the fourth season of Chuck. It aired on March 14, 2011. Chuck Bartowski and Sarah Walker suspect John Casey is carrying out private missions. Chuck fears the CIA's new operatives (Isaiah Mustafa and Stacy Keibler), who have downloaded the Intersect, will render him obsolete. Morgan Grimes settles in with Casey, his new roommate. Devon Woodcomb becomes uncomfortable with Ellie Woodcomb's research.

Plot
The episode begins with Morgan Grimes interrogated by an unknown man for information on John Casey, his new roommate. When Morgan refuses to reveal anything, the man reveals himself to be Casey and congratulates Morgan on passing the test. Chuck Bartowski and Sarah Walker are becoming bored with their lack of missions, and begin to suspect Casey is carrying out missions without them. Morgan refuses to tell Chuck anything, so Chuck and Sarah follow Casey on their own. Casey meets with Necati Acar a.k.a. "The Turk" (Timur Kocak), posing as a messenger of Russian criminal Dragan Pichushkin (Jon Sklaroff). The Turk, however, reveals that he knows Casey's name and true occupation as an NSA agent and has guards draw their guns on Casey. Chuck and Sarah reveal themselves in order to protect Casey, but several more of the Turk's guards then reveal themselves. Casey motions to the guards nearest him, who turn and kill the rest of the Turk's men. When they remove their masks and arrest the Turk, Chuck recognizes them as the second and third Buy More employee named "Greta". The individuals are introduced as Casey's NCS team, Captain Richard Noble (Isaiah Mustafa) and Captain Victoria Dunwoody (Stacy Keibler), who Chuck nicknames "Rick" and "Vicki".

Sarah worries that the CIA is replacing them with Casey's extremely efficient team, but Chuck considers himself irreplaceable with the Intersect. General Diane Beckman reveals that Pichushkin has made a fortune dismantling the former Soviet arsenal and selling it on the black market. The Turk is willing to lure Pichushkin onto United States soil in exchange for asylum for his family. Chuck and Sarah travel to Tbilisi, Georgia, to retrieve "Jana" and guarantee the Turk's cooperation. Chuck and Sarah are glad to finally have a mission, but they soon learn that Jana is the Turk's beloved dog.

Unsatisfied, Chuck and Sarah decide to prove their worth. Hearing Jana's barking, they deduct that the Turk is in the NCS-restricted part of Castle. They break into Casey's apartment, tranquilize Morgan, and take Casey's handprint from his framed photograph of Ronald Reagan, gaining access to the NCS area of Castle. They soon find Stephen J. Bartowski's laptop Intersect. Rick and Vicki appear and try to remove Chuck from the area, but Chuck flashes to defend himself. After a brief fight, Chuck realizes that they are all using the same technique; Rick and Vicki have uploaded the Intersect. Chuck tries to retrieve the laptop, but Director Jane Bentley (Robin Givens) arrives and stops him, warning him that her Intersects won't hesitate to "pull the trigger" like him.

Bentley reveals that the G.R.E.T.A. field test used the Buy More as proving ground for prospective Intersect candidates. She also alludes to the fact that the intersect software has been modified, possibly explaining the lack of emotion displayed by the two 'Greta' agents. She briefs the team, revealing that Pichushkin is en route to on a stolen jet. Rick and Vicki flash on a surveillance video, learning that Pichushkin is transporting a fully assembled bomb. Against Bentley's reservations, Casey requests that Chuck and Sarah be used as backup for the mission, as he does not wish for them to go "obsolete". Chuck is assigned to bomb disposal to allow Casey and his team to arrest Pichushkin.

When Pichushkin arrives, Rick and Vicki shoot his bodyguards, before he reveals that he is carrying a suitcase nuke and has possession of a remote arming device. As he flees, Sarah and Vicki pursue him, while Chuck joins Casey and Rick to disarm the bomb. Sarah finds Pichushkin, who informs her that the arming device is wired to his heartbeat to activate when he dies, drawing a gun on Sarah. Before Sarah can warn her, Vicki shoots Pichushkin, arming the nuclear device. Rick declares that the bomb is too complicated for the Intersect to disarm, but Chuck attempts to do so nonetheless. After flashing on the detonator, Chuck realizes the component is from a Chinese submarine and must have been designed to deactivate in the presence of salt water in case of hull breaches. He then uses the sodium in his apple juice to defuse the bomb.

After the botched operation, Beckman gives Chuck control of the Intersect program and has the Intersect extracted from Rick and Vicki's brain's - to the obvious relief of them both. Rick expresses sympathy for Chuck at being forced to live with the intersect. However, Bentley believes that the flaw is not with the agents in possession of the Intersect, but rather the laptop itself. She then returns it to Ellie Woodcomb.

Ellie and Devon
Ellie asks Devon Woodcomb for her father's laptop back, believing that he sent it to her for a reason. Having given it to Chuck in "Chuck Versus the Leftovers", Devon calls Chuck and asks for the laptop back. Aside from wanting to keep Ellie out of the spy world, Chuck no longer possesses the laptop, believing it to be secure in Langley, Virginia. Chuck suggests telling Ellie that he sent the laptop to the Nerd Herd, so that Ellie would think Jeff Barnes and Lester Patel misplaced it.

Ellie goes to the Buy More, where Lester is testing Jeff's extrasensory perception with Zener cards. They unsuccessfully search for the laptop, suspecting that they may have returned it to the wrong customer. Lester tests Jeff's clairvoyance by having him write down the location of the laptop, and Jeff correctly predicts that the laptop is in the possession of the CIA. However, Lester misreads the prediction, believing it to be a person named "Cia".

Ellie is then given the laptop by Director Bentley, posing as a Buy More customer who was given the laptop by mistake, in the hope that Ellie will be able to decode it.

Production
It was announced on February 25, 2011, that Isaiah Mustafa and Stacy Keibler would reprise their role of the second and third Greta from "Chuck Versus the Suitcase" and "Chuck Versus the Cubic Z", respectively. It was revealed on March 11, 2011, that their actual names would be Captain Rick Noble and Captain Victoria Dunwoody. This episode marked the return of writer Phil Klemmer, a writer from the original staff who departed to write for the series Undercovers.

Continuity
The episode reveals that the Gretas from earlier in the fourth season were prospective Intersect candidates, and that the Buy More was being used as a proving ground.

Devon addresses Ellie by her full name and two abbreviated postnominals, revealing for the first time that, in addition to her M.D., she earned a Ph.D. at some point.

When forced to disarm the bomb, Chuck says, "Just like old times," alluding to "Chuck Versus the Intersect", where he is put in a similar situation.

This was the first time Chuck was willing to fight a woman.

Flashes
Throughout the episode, Chuck, Rick, and Vicki experience several of the same flashes, sometimes flashing on the same object multiple times each. The contents of these flashes include martial arts skills, marksmanship skills, and classified information.

Music
Songs listed by Alan Sepinwall.
 "Murder Weapon" by Tricky
 "You & Me" by Diamond Rings
 "No Man is an Island" by Losers
 "Ticking Heart" by The One AM Radio

Cultural references
 The episode's title alludes to the series The A-Team. Throughout the episode, Chuck and Sarah alternate between referring to themselves as the "A-Team" and the "B-Team" in relation to Casey's team.
 Morgan says, "My only regret is that I have one life to give", nearly quoting the last words of Nathan Hale.
 Chuck and Sarah have several games, including Twister, Operation, Monopoly, Mousetrap and Final Fantasy II.
 Chuck says that using automatic doors is just like using the Force.
 Lester's experiments on Jeff allude to the opening scene of Ghostbusters.
 Morgan quotes Jurassic Park when he says "Clever girl". The same two-word phrase is also spoken to Jodie Foster's characters in both The Silence of the Lambs and Contact.
 After hearing Sarah's explanation of how they will obtain Casey's handprint, Chuck says, "Ech... sounds like a CBS show." (in reference to CSI).
 Chuck fears he will suffer the same demise as Guy Pearce's character from The Hurt Locker.
 Chuck compares Noble and Dunwoody to terminators.
 Noble calls the bomb a "Frankenstein".

Reception
"Chuck Versus the A-Team" received positive reviews from critics. HitFix writer Alan Sepinwall wrote, "From the perspective of a continuity-obsessed fanboy, I appreciate the return of those old subplots. And it helped that they came in a strong overall episode, one that featured a good character arc for all three original members of Operation Bartowski - not to mention one that brought back the government's ongoing desire to have someone other than Chuck have an Intersect in his head." Hayden Childs of The A.V. Club gave the episode a B-, writing, "The last episode was a fun one, which is at least partly due to the presence of Ray Wise, one of those character actors who elevates material both great and crappy. This one, however, has the guy from the Old Spice commercials.  Perhaps he, too, is an excellent actor, but he doesn’t have much to do here besides look blandly arrogant."

Eric Goldman of IGN gave this episode a score of 7 out of 10. Though he enjoyed having clarity about the G.R.E.T.A. program, Goldman was disappointed with the episode's impact writing that Rick and Vicki got "Intersects very quickly, and I think the impact was particularly diminished by the fact that it all seemed to wrap up just as quickly. Wouldn't it have been more interesting to have had these two, and their much more clinical, methodical approach to using the Intersect, stick around for a few episodes, as Chuck has to process what it might mean for his future?"

The episode drew 4.92 million viewers, the second-lowest number in Chuck history at the time of the episode's airing, after "Chuck Versus Phase Three".

References

External links
 

A-Team
2011 American television episodes